The Lublin trolleybus is a trolleybus network serving Lublin metropolitan area in Poland. It is one of the four Polish cities that currently have such a network, along with Gdynia, Sopot and Tychy.

Main lines

Fleet

Museum fleet

References

External links

Lublin
Lublin
Lublin